Armas Johannes Pesonen (25 March 1885 – 20 May 1947) was a Finnish track and field athlete, who competed at the 1908 Summer Olympics.

Athletics 

He is credited with a Finnish record in long jump, result 636, made on 7 July 1906.

His personal best in javelin was 50.62 metres with his better hand and 89.28 metres as his two handed total. He recorded them in the qualification round of the 1909 Finnish championships.

Career 

He began working in the Finnish state railways at the age of 19, eventually becoming a station master in 1928.

He fought in the Finnish Civil War in Karelia. He briefly served in the Finnish Defence Forces, reaching the rank of lieutenant. He later took part in White Guard activities.

Sources

References

1885 births
1947 deaths
Finnish male javelin throwers
Olympic athletes of Finland
Athletes (track and field) at the 1908 Summer Olympics